Vega C flight VV22 was the  launch of the Vega rocket. The rocket failed after launch and the mission was lost.

Payload 
The payload was composed of the  5 and 6 satellites, which would have been the final satellites of the Pléiades Neo constellation. With their adapters and dispensers, the total payload mass was approximately 1,977 kilograms. They were Airbus' 138th and 139th satellites launched by Arianespace respectively.

Flight 
The flight was launched from the ELV launch pad in Kourou, Centre Spatial Guyanais.

Launch failure 
The flight was planned to deploy the satellites into 2 very slightly different sun-synchronous orbits at roughly 620 km. The problem arose due to erosion of the throat insert procured at KB Pivdenne in Ukraine.

See also 

 List of Vega launches

References

External links 
 Vega-C flight VV22 at Arianespace

Vega (rocket)
2022 in French Guiana
Rocket launches in 2022